ATTALOSS is the first full-length album from the alternative rock band Attaloss, which was released by Rock Ridge Music/Warner Music Group/ADA. The self-titled debut hit number one on the Billboard Alternative New Artists chart, number five on the Billboard Heatseekers chart, number 38 on the Billboard Current Alternative Albums chart, and number 42 on the Billboard Indie chart. The album also cracked the Billboard 200 sales chart. The first single, "Open Door" is at alternative specialty radio with airplay at WEND (Charlotte), KPNT (St. Louis) and KCXX (Riverside), among others.

Track listing
All songs by Attaloss

Personnel
Danny Aguiluz – vocals
Lorenzo Perea – bass
Chris Johansen – lead guitar
Matt Geronimo – guitar, vocals
Dakota Clark – drums
Erik Ron – production, mixing, engineering
Jens Funke - production

References

2012 debut albums